Phytotelmatrichis osopaddington is a species of beetle in the family Ptiliidae, or the featherwing beetles. It is only known from Peru. It is one of the top 10 new species named in 2015.

Etymology
The specific name osopaddington honours Paddington Bear, born in "darkest Peru". With this, the authors wanted to draw attention to conservation of fragmented habitats of the spectacled bear, and other animals and plants.

Description 
It lives in phytotelmata of plants in the order Zingiberales, small pools of water that may form in upright bracts or leaf axils of a plant.

References 

Ptiliidae
Beetles of South America
Invertebrates of Peru
Endemic fauna of Peru
Beetles described in 2015